The 2001 American Le Mans Series season was the third season for the IMSA American Le Mans Series, and the 31st overall season of the IMSA GT Championship.  It was a series for Le Mans Prototypes (LMP) and Grand Touring (GT) race cars divided into 4 classes: LMP900, LMP675, GTS, and GT.  It began March 4, 2001 and ended October 6, 2001 after 10 races.

This season shared events with the new European Le Mans Series, with two events being held in Europe.

Schedule
The schedule for the 2001 featured the only time in ALMS history that the opening event was not the 12 Hours of Sebring, instead being preceded by the Grand Prix of Texas.  After Sebring, the two ELMS rounds at Donington Park and Jarama were optional for ALMS teams as the next North American event was not until after Le Mans.  The Mid-Ohio Sports Car Course was added to the schedule, replacing previous races at Las Vegas Motor Speedway and Charlotte Motor Speedway.  This was the last season to feature events held on road courses at oval circuits.

† - Joint event with ELMS.

Season results

Overall winner in bold.

Teams' Championship

Points are awarded to the finishers in the following order:
 25-21-19-17-15-14-13-12-11-10-...
Exceptions being for the 12 Hours of Sebring and Petit Le Mans which awarded in the following order:
 30-26-24-22-20-19-18-17-16-15-...

Points were awarded in two separate ways. Only the best finish out of the two European rounds (3 and 4) was included. In addition to this, only the top eight finishes for the entire season were included. Points earned but not counting towards the team's total are listed in italics.

Teams only score the points of their highest finishing entry in each race.

LMP900 standings

LMP675 standings

GTS standings

GT standings

External links
 American Le Mans Series homepage
 IMSA Archived ALMS Results and Points

American Le Mans
Le Mans Series
American Le Mans Series seasons